Two Twisted is an Australian TV mystery anthology drama which premiered on the Nine Network on 14 August 2006. Narrated by Bryan Brown, who also produced the series' predecessor, Twisted Tales, each episode of the series contains two short half-hour stories, that have a twist ending. Also present in each episode is a link or connection between the two tales.

Rather than draw on a pool of experienced writers, the producers of the series issued a call to up-and-coming writers to submit screenplays. Some 2,400 entries were received and from these, 14 finalists were chosen. Directors were chosen in a similar fashion. A mix of experienced and emerging directors were chosen to shoot each episode.

Each episode was shot over a period of four days with each director given another four days to edit.

Episodes
(Episode information retrieved from Australian Television Information Archive).

<onlyinclude>

Ratings

Episode Pair Links
In each pair of episodes in Two Twisted, there is a link between them (Like an object or a name that's in both episode).
Here are the links in each pair of episodes:

 There's Something About Kyanna & Finding Frank
 Mid way into the first episode, the camera moves over a book titled Trespassers.
 About the same way through the second episode, the main character Frank, looks at a picture. Behind it is the same book, Trespassers.
 Call Back & Heart Attack
 Toward the end of the first episode, an ambulance blocks the road as it tends to a fallen bicyclist.
 In the second, the lead male suffers a heart attack while on his bike, the same model seen in the previous episode.
 Von Stauffenberg's Stamp & A Date With Doctor D
 In the middle of the first episode, an offer was made to buy the barbershop.
 In the second, Rolly broke a coffee cup that had underneath it a corporate proposal to buy the barbershop in the first episode.
 Soft Boiled Luck & Arkham's Curios and Wonders
 Near the start of the first episode, a red cube puzzle is used as "a cognitive test for the shrinks, part of the psych report".
 In the second, the puzzle is seen in Vincent's bedroom, on a shelf, beside a plasma ball. The puzzle is never shown in clear focus during the episode, but is seen in the "Rik Bitta" segment for the week.
 A Flash Exclusive & Delivery Man
 Man and Van which visits the first woman to deliver groceries are the same ones in the next episode.
Jailbreak & Saviour
In the start of the first episode, the doctor is stitching up a man as Jenkins walks in.
This same man is the immortal man in the second episode.
Love Crimes & Grand Final
In the start of the episode, Vince Colosimo's character sees a note on the fridge from 'Mason', stating that he will be late at basketball training.
In the second episode, Dan's friend is called Mase (obviously short for Mason), and plays basketball, so it's the same boy.

See also
List of Australian television series
List of programs broadcast by Nine Network

References

External links

Two Twisted at the national Film and Sound Archive

APRA Award winners
Australian anthology television series
Australian drama television series
Nine Network original programming
2006 Australian television series debuts
2006 Australian television series endings